Molodizhne is a rural settlement in Alchevsk Raion (district) in Luhansk Oblast of eastern Ukraine, at about 65 km WNW from the centre of Luhansk city.

The settlement was taken under control of pro-Russian forces during the War in Donbass, that started in 2014.

Demographics
In 2001 the settlement had 367 inhabitants. Native language distribution as of the Ukrainian Census of 2001:
Ukrainian: 13.62%
Russian: 86.38%

References

Villages in Alchevsk Raion